Johann Le Bihan (born March 10, 1979) is a retired medley swimmer from France, who represented his native country at the 2000 Summer Olympics. He won the bronze medal at the 2000 European Long Course Championships in the men's 400 m individual medley event.

References
 

1979 births
Living people
French male medley swimmers
Swimmers at the 2000 Summer Olympics
Olympic swimmers of France
Place of birth missing (living people)
European Aquatics Championships medalists in swimming
20th-century French people
21st-century French people